Lothar is a family name and a given name. 

Lothar may also refer to:
 Lothar (storm), an extratropical cyclone that hit Central Europe in 1999
 Lothar (Metabarons), a fictional robot in Metabarons
 Lothar, Nepal
 Lothar I or Lothair I (795–855)
 Lothar, a fictional character and sidekick of Mandrake the Magician

See also

Lotar (disambiguation)
 The Cross of Lothair is sometimes called the "Cross of Lothar"
 Lothair (disambiguation)
 Chlothar, an earlier version of the above name Lothair (Lotharius)
 Lotharingia
 Lothario
 Luther (disambiguation)
 Lothar and the Hand People, a psychedelic musical group
 Lothar of the Hill People, a fictional character on Saturday Night Live